A. William Schenck III is a former Secretary of the Pennsylvania Department of Banking.  He currently serves on the Pennsylvania Higher Education Assistance Agency Board.

References

Living people
State cabinet secretaries of Pennsylvania
Year of birth missing (living people)